This is a list of programs broadcast on the CBC Radio One and CBC Music networks of the Canadian Broadcasting Corporation.

CBC Radio One

Current

Acquired programming

Past

CBC Music

Current

Past

References